Italy competed at the 1977 Summer Universiade in Sofia, Bulgaria and won 6 medals.

Medals

Details

References

External links
 Universiade (World University Games)
 WORLD STUDENT GAMES (UNIVERSIADE - MEN)
 WORLD STUDENT GAMES (UNIVERSIADE - WOMEN)

1977
1977 in Italian sport
1977 Summer Universiade